Marinobacter salsuginis is a Gram-negative and moderately halophilic bacterium from the genus of Marinobacter which has been isolated from seawater from the Shaban Deep from the Red Sea. The strain BS2 of Marinobacter salsuginis can reduce the mortality of the shrimps Penaeus monodon and Litopenaeus vannamei by killing the dinoflagellate Noctiluca scintillans. The strain 5N-3 can degrade 1,2-Dichloroethene (cis-DCE) in the absence of inducing substrates like phenol.[6]

References

Further reading

External links
Type strain of Marinobacter salsuginis at BacDive -  the Bacterial Diversity Metadatabase

Alteromonadales
Bacteria described in 2007